Great Hermitage of Tatev or Tatevi Mets Anapat is a 17th-century Armenian monastery located in the Vorotan River valley in the Syunik Province of Armenia. The National Competitiveness Foundation of Armenia is going to create a tourism zone in the Tatev area to draw visitors to its amazing churches and scenery. The Tatevi Anapat is going to be one of the main sights.

See also 
 Tatev, a nearby 9th century Armenian monastery

Tatevi Mets Anapat – The Great Hermitage of Tatev
This medieval architectural complex which used to be a renowned religious center is situated on the right cliff of the river Vorotan, where the river intersects with its tributary Tatev. The construction of this complex began in 1660, and the main reason was the destruction of Harants hermitage which lied on the same cliff, to the south of the current complex. The aforementioned hermitage was demolished in 1658, after which Hakob patriarch decided to build Tatevi Mets Anapat (the Great Hermitage of Tatev) and to transfer the former congregation to there. 

The layout of the Great Hermitage of Tatev
The regular layout of the complex is an imitation of the previous monastery, the only difference is that it is bigger in size now. The main part of the complex consists of rectangular limestone walls with beautiful towers, while the ancillary part on the south has a tablelike layout. The Great Hermitage of Tatev is situated on a slightly slanted dell formed as a result of the gradually widening Vorotan gorge, concealed between walnut and fig trees, which makes the external contemplation of this construction nearly impossible. Nevertheless, notwithstanding the fact that the hermitage is isolated from the outer world, there is one place from which the whole complex is visible. It is the facing slope of the gorge through which the sinuous road leading to the Monastery Complex of Tatev passes. Furthermore, it is worth noting that despite having some minor unevenness, this territory used to be an ideal place for establishing such like structure since it is close to the river and has access to a cold creek.

Tatevi Mets Anapat
Tatevi Mets Anapat

The Great Hermitage of TatevTatevi Mets AnapatThe Great Hermitage of Tatev
Architectural gem or a religious center?
The regular plan of the complex mimics the previous one (Herants). It consists of the main building which is a beautiful construction with huge pillars, towers, limestone walls, and an aligned structure. Moreover, as it was already mentioned, the gradient of the territory is very slight, which allowed to get a relatively regular layout.

This complex played a prominent role in the religious life of Armenia. According to several historical records, more than 700 congregates lived here. Therefore, the building used to be one of the largest religious centers in the region and significantly contributed to the development of manuscript writing in the province of Syunik.

Tatevi Mets Anapat
Tatevi Mets Anapat

The Great Hermitage of TatevArmGeo - The Great Hermitage of TatevThe Great Hermitage of Tatev - ArmGeo
Furthermore, it is a noteworthy fact that despite its religious value, the building itself was a powerful architectural project which encapsulated all of the unites and prerequisites needed to establish a real household. More specifically, the complex had barns, a refectory with a kitchen and stone-made tables, residential areas and the St. Astavatsatsin basalt church (1663) with its chapel and churchyard (1743) that came to finalize the picture of this complex as a religious monument.

External links 
 Official Website

Christian monasteries in Armenia
Buildings and structures in Syunik Province
Tourist attractions in Syunik Province